|}

The Vincent O'Brien National Stakes is a Group 1 flat horse race in Ireland open to two-year-old thoroughbred colts and fillies. It is run at the Curragh over a distance of 7 furlongs (1,408 metres), and it is scheduled to take place each year in September.

History
The event was established in 1849, and it was originally called the National Produce Stakes and then the National Stakes. The inaugural running was won by Chatterbox.

For a period the National Stakes was classed at Group 2 level, and it was promoted to Group 1 in 1985. It was extended from 7 furlongs to a mile in 1997, but its former distance was restored in 2000.

The race became known as the Vincent O'Brien National Stakes in 2009, in memory of the successful trainer Vincent O'Brien (1917–2009). It reverted to its previous title in 2011 but was renamed the Vincent O'Brien Stakes in 2012. In 2014 the title reverted to the Vincent O'Brien National Stakes and it became part of the Irish Champions Weekend fixture.

The National Stakes was formerly part of the Breeders' Cup Challenge series, with the winner earning an automatic invitation to compete in the Breeders' Cup Juvenile Turf. It was removed from the series in 2012.

Records

Leading jockey since 1947 (4 wins):
 Lester Piggott – Cellini (1973), Sir Wimborne (1975), El Prado (1991), Fatherland (1992)
 Michael Kinane – Definite Article (1994), Mus-If (1998), Hawk Wing (2001), One Cool Cat (2003)

Leading trainer since 1947 (15 wins):
 Vincent O'Brien – Sir Ivor (1967), Roberto (1971), Chamozzle (1972), Cellini (1973), Sir Wimborne (1975), Monteverdi (1979), Storm Bird (1980), Glenstal (1982), El Gran Senor (1983), Law Society (1984), Tate Gallery (1985), Caerwent (1987), Classic Fame (1988), El Prado (1991), Fatherland (1992)

Leading owner since 1976 (11 wins): (includes part ownership)
 Michael Tabor – Danehill Dancer (1995), Desert King (1996), King of Kings (1997), Beckett (2000), One Cool Cat (2003), George Washington (2005), Mastercraftsman (2008), Power (2011), Gleneagles (2014), Air Force Blue (2015), Churchill (2016)

Winners since 1976

Earlier winners

 1849: Chatterbox
 1850: Third of May
 1851: Barbarian
 1852: The Deformed
 1853: Knight of St George
 1855: Citron
 1857: Barbary
 1858: Mount Zion
 1859: Good Boy
 1869: The Tyrconnell
 1870: Maid of Athens
 1871: Prodigal
 1872: Queen of the Bees
 1877: Inamorata
 1880: Barcaldine
 1886: Gallinule
 1891: Red Prince
 1895: Chit Chat
 1897: Sirenia
 1900: St Helena
 1901: Bachelor's Button
 1906: Silver Fowl
 1907: Americus Girl
 1909: Kilbroney
 1912: Royal Weaver
 1914: Offaly
 1915: Ayn Hali
 1918: Grand Parade
 1920: Soldennis
 1923: Vesington Star
 1927: Athford
 1928: Soloptic
 1929: Ballyferis
 1933: Cariff
 1944: Solid Pact
 1947: Morning Wings
 1948: Tribal Song
 1949: First View
 1950: Star Wire
 1951: Blue Butterfly
 1952: Sea Charger
 1953: Calvero
 1954: Panaslipper
 1955: Black Patch
 1956: El Minzah
 1957: Talmud
 1958: Babu
 1959: His Story
 1960: Paris Princess
 1961: Mystery
 1962: Partholon
 1963: Santa Claus
 1964: Prominer
 1965: Reubens
 1966: House Proud
 1967: Sir Ivor
 1968: Thataboy
 1969: Decies
 1970: King's Company
 1971: Roberto
 1972: Chamozzle
 1973: Cellini
 1974: Reap the Wind
 1975: Sir Wimborne

See also
 Horse racing in Ireland
 List of Irish flat horse races
 Recurring sporting events established in 1849  – this race is included under its original title, National Produce Stakes.

References

 Paris-Turf: 
 Racing Post:

 galopp-sieger.de – Irish National Stakes.
 horseracingintfed.com – International Federation of Horseracing Authorities – National Stakes (2018).
 irishracinggreats.com – National Stakes (Group 1).
 pedigreequery.com – National Stakes – Curragh.

Flat races in Ireland
Curragh Racecourse
Flat horse races for two-year-olds
1849 establishments in Ireland